is a city located in Aichi Prefecture, Japan. , the city had an estimated population of 87,651 in 36,997 households, and a population density of 3,188 persons per km². Ama is a member of the World Health Organization’s Alliance for Healthy Cities (AFHC).

Geography
Ama is located in the far west of Aichi Prefecture in the middle of the Nōbi Plain. The city is at or below sea level. Ama is located 15 minutes from downtown Nagoya by car or train.

Climate
The city has a climate characterized by hot and humid summers, and relatively mild winters (Köppen climate classification Cfa).  The average annual temperature in Ama is 15.7 °C. The average annual rainfall is 1699 mm with September as the wettest month. The temperatures are highest on average in August, at around 28.0 °C, and lowest in January, at around 4.4 °C.

Demographics
Per Japanese census data, the population of Ama has been increasing rapidly over the past 50 years.

Neighboring municipalities
Aichi Prefecture
Nagoya – Nakagawa-ku, Nakamura-ku
Inazawa
Kiyosu
Tsushima
Aisai
Kanie
Ōharu

History

Origins
Ama was part of the former Owari Province, and has been inhabited continuously since the Jomon period.

Ancient history
The temple of Jimoku-ji was founded in the Asuka period by Empress Suiko.

Middle Ages
From the Kamakura period, it was a shukuba on the Kamakura Kaidō.
During the Sengoku period, it was the home of the daimyō Hachisuka Masakatsu, whose clan ruled from Hachitsuka Castle.
It was also the birthplace of Fukushima Masanori, another Sengoku-period warlord.

Early modern period
During the Edo period, it formed part of the holdings of the Owari Tokugawa of Owari Domain.
From the Edo period, the area was known as a center for Cloisonné production.

Late modern period
During the early Meiji period, the area was organized into several villages under Ama District, Aichi Prefecture with the establishment of the modern municipalities system.

Contemporary history
Jimokuji, was elevated to town status in 1933, Miwa in 1958 and Shippō in 1966. The three towns, plus the town of Ōharu began merger discussions in 2008; however, an agreement could not be made with Ōharu, which left the discussions later that year. The remaining three towns passed a referendum in 2009, and the new city of Ama was founded and created on March 22, 2010.

Government

Ama has a mayor-council form of government with a directly elected mayor and a unicameral city legislature of 22 members. The city contributes two members to the Aichi Prefectural Assembly.  In terms of national politics, the city is part of Aichi District 9 of the lower house of the Diet of Japan.

Economy

Ceramic engineering
Cloisonné（Owari Cloisonné）

Commerce
Due to its proximity to the Nagoya metropolis, Ama has developed into a commuter town and its population has grown rapidly.

Education
Ama has twelve public elementary schools and five public middle schools operated by the city government and two public high schools operated by the Aichi Prefectural Board of Education.

Transportation

Railways

Conventional lines
Meitetsu
Tsushima Line：-  -  -  -

Roads

Expressways
 Nagoya Daini Kanjo Expressway
 Higashi-Meihan Expressway

Japan National Route

Local attractions
Shippo Art Village
Site of Hachitsuka Castle
Jimoku-ji, Buddhist temple from the Asuka period

Notable people from Ama

Fukushima Masanori, Samurai
Hachisuka Masakatsu, Samurai
Maeda Matsu, Maeda Toshiie's wife
Noboru Ogasawara, physician
Nobutaka Hirano, volleyball player
Junichi Sato, anime director
Yūko Mizutani (1964 - 2016), seiyū

References

External links

  

 
Cities in Aichi Prefecture